The River Maigue rises in the Milford area of north County Cork, Ireland. The River Maigue is 38.75 miles long. It drains an area of 1,000 km2

It is joined by the small River Glen and the larger River Loobagh in south County Limerick. It then flows north through Bruree, after which it augmented by the River Morning Star. It flows through Croom and Adare before entering the Shannon Estuary just north of Ferry Bridge (Between) Kildimo and Clarina, County Limerick, just west of Limerick city. The River Maigue is tidal up to Adare on the N21 Road Bridge.

History
In ancient times the Maigue was central to the territories of the O'Donovans and their predecessors in Uí Chairpre Áebda (Cairbre Eva). The majority of its towns and villages were once the sites of fortresses. Later these territories were occupied by the FitzGerald dynasty.

The beautiful slow song in Irish, ‘Slán le Máigh’, was written by Aindrias Mac Craith, a poet from the local area who lived in the 18th century. The song is still widely sung and is also played as a slow air.

Tributaries

River Loobagh
The Loobagh is a river with healthy Trout and Salmon populations. It rises in the hills south of Kilfinane and flows through Kilmallock. It joins the Maigue south of Bruree.

Morning Star River
The Morning Star is a little river which flows westwards through rich farmland through Bruff and Athlacca to join the Maigue north of Bruree.

Camogue River
The River Camogue flows in a westerly direction through Grange, Meanus and Manister and joins the Maigue upstream of Croom.

See also
 Rivers of Ireland

References

External links

Maigue River Guide

Maigue
Maigue
Adare
O'Donovan family
Tributaries of the River Shannon